Nupserha ustulata is a species of beetle in the family Cerambycidae. It was described by Wilhelm Ferdinand Erichson in 1834. It is known from the Philippines and Malaysia.

Subspecies
 Nupserha ustulata ustulata (Erichson, 1834)
 Nupserha ustulata palawanensis Breuning, 1960
 Nupserha ustulata borneensis Breuning, 1960
 Nupserha ustulata mindanaonis Breuning, 1960
 Nupserha ustulata boholensis Breuning, 1960

References

ustulata
Beetles described in 1834